Calloria is a genus of brachiopods belonging to the family Terebratellidae.

The species of this genus are found in New Zealand.

Species:

Calloria inconspicua 
Calloria variegata

References

Brachiopod genera